Zum, also written as Zūm, is an American student transportation services company, based in Redwood City, California, U.S.

Zum provides contract transportation services to school districts across the United States, it provides an app that parents can download to precisely track the location of their children on Zum’s buses as they go to and from school.

History
Zum was founded in 2014 by Ritu Narayan, Vivek Garg and Abhishek Garg, after identifying a problem faced by the working mothers. It developed a technology platform that optimizes routes and improves communication to replace old yellow school buses.

Zum initially started its operations from California in early 2016. In February 2019, BMW invested $40 million in the company to expand its operations outside California. Previously, it has received $19 million in Series B round in 2018 and $5.5 million in Series A round in 2017.

In 2019, Zum entered in a $150 million contract with San Francisco Unified Schools District to operate the transportation system in the district.

In February 2020, Zum began a partnership with Oakland Unified School District to provide transportation services to its students.

In October 2021, the company received funding of $130 million which they intend to expand its fleet by adding around ten thousand electric vehicles to its platform.

In May 2022, Zum was included in the CNBC Distruptor 50 list and was valued around $1 billion.

In July 2022, it was given a three-year contract by the Seattle School Board to provide school transportation services to its students.

The Atlantic describes it as an Uber-like service for kids' transportation.

References

Android (operating system) software
2014 establishments in California